The president of the Supreme Court is the head of the Supreme Court of Spain, an office created in 1812. Since 1980, the president of the Supreme Court is also the president of the General Council of the Judiciary, the governing body of the Judiciary of Spain. As such, the president is the defined in Section 105 of the Judiciary Organic Act as the "first judicial authority of the Nation" and "represents the Judicial Power and its governing body". That precept also establishes that, the president will hold those "category and honors" corresponding to the holder of one of the three powers of the State.

List of presidents of the Supreme Court 
Since its creation in 1812, 47 people have served as president in 48 presidencies, and one as acting president, Francisco Marín Castán since 2022. The first president was Ramón Posada y Soto who served during the first period of live of the institution from 1812 to 1814. The shortest presidency was that of José Hevia y Noriega who served 113 days and the longest was that of José Castán Tobeñas who served 22 years and 81 days. Lorenzo Arrazola y García has been the only person to serve in two different terms, the first between 1851 and 1853 and the second time from 1856 to 1864.

Eight of them have also held the position of president of the General Council of the Judiciary (CGPJ). The first holder was Federico Carlos Sainz de Robles y Rodríguez from 1980 to 1986.

The current and 48th president of the Supreme Court, as well as 8th president of the General Council of the Judiciary is Carlos Lesmes since December 2018. His tenure ended in December 2018, however, because of the political deadlock, he is serving as acting president since then.

See also 
 Supreme Court of Spain
 President of the Supreme Court of Spain
 President of the Constitutional Court of Spain
 General Council of the Judiciary

References

Lists of Spanish judges
Lists of office-holders in Spain